Shoshannah Stern (born July 3, 1980) is an American actress and writer.

Life and career
She was born in Walnut Creek, California, into an observant Jewish and fourth-generation Deaf family, the daughter of Ron Stern and Hedy Marilyn Stern (née Udkovich), and the sister of writer and artist Louise Stern and former Gallaudet Men's Basketball Coach and current political scientist Brendan Stern. Both of her grandmothers are Holocaust survivors.  Her hometown is Fremont, California, where she attended the California School for the Deaf, Fremont.

Stern's first language is American Sign Language. She is also able to read lips and speak English without an interpreter. She attended Gallaudet University, the only liberal arts college for the Deaf in the world.

She married her husband, Ricky Mitchell, on June 3, 2012, in Santa Fe, New Mexico. Their daughter was born in February 2015. She currently resides with him in Hollywood, California.

Stern got her first regular series role as Holly Brodeen, a member of an elite government anti-terrorist task force in ABC's Threat Matrix. The role was created for her by the show's producers after a director who had worked with her on The Division recommended her. She had a recurring role in Showtime's Weeds (as Megan Beals-Botwin) and was also on ER, Providence and Cold Case. She played Bonnie Richmond in the CBS post-apocalyptic drama Jericho. She had a recurring role in Season 3 of Fox's Lie to Me.

Stern appeared with Matthew Broderick in the film The Last Shot and starred in the film Adventures of Power. She also appeared in the popular music video "Yes We Can", written by will.i.am for the Barack Obama campaign.

Her 2020 role on Grey's Anatomy is the first recurring Deaf doctor role on a prime time television network show.

She also played the recurring character Eileen on the CW show Supernatural.

She is also set to write episodes of the upcoming Hawkeye spin-off series Echo, set in the Marvel Cinematic Universe starring Alaqua Cox.

She also appears in the credits of season one, episode 5 Endure and Survive of HBO Max show The Last of Us, a dystopian series on HBO Max where cordyceps mushrooms mutate and take over society set in the present day.

Filmography

Film

Television

Stage

Deaf West Theatre
Open Window .... Susan (directed by Eric Simonson)
Children of a Lesser God .... Sarah (directed by Joe Giamalva)

California School for the Deaf Theatre Program
Romeo and Juliet .... Juliet (directed by Julianna Fjeld)
Aladdin .... Dancer (directed by CJ Jones)
The Cat and the Canary .... Annabelle (directed by CJ Jones)
A Funny Thing Happened on the Way to the Forum .... Gymnasia (directed by CJ Jones)
Anne of Green Gables .... Anne (directed by Charles Katz)

References

External links
 Shoshannah Stern official site
 

1980 births
Actresses from California
American deaf actresses
American television actresses
Jewish American actresses
Living people
People from Walnut Creek, California
American stage actresses
21st-century American actresses
American deaf people
21st-century American Jews
Gallaudet University alumni